Slobodka is a rural locality (a village) in Veliky Ustyug Urban Settlement, Velikoustyugsky District, Vologda Oblast, Russia. The population was 244 as of 2002.

Geography 
The distance to Veliky Ustyug is 0.5 km. Popovkino is the nearest rural locality.

References 

Rural localities in Velikoustyugsky District